Marion School District or Marion Independent School District may refer to:

 Marion School District (Arkansas), Marion, Arkansas
 Marion Community Unit School District 2, Marion, Illinois
 Marion Independent School District (Iowa), Marion, Iowa
 Marion Central School District, Marion, New York
 Marion School District 60-3, Marion, South Dakota
 Marion Independent School District (Texas), Marion, Texas
 Marion School District (Wisconsin), Marion, Wisconsin